Manfred Steiner (13 January 1950 – 21 October 2020) was an Austrian footballer. He played in two matches for the Austria national football team in 1975.

References

External links
 

1950 births
2020 deaths
Austrian footballers
Austria international footballers
Place of birth missing
Association footballers not categorized by position
Austrian football managers
SK Sturm Graz managers